The 2008 NCAA men's volleyball tournament was the 39th annual tournament to determine the national champion of NCAA men's collegiate indoor volleyball. The single elimination tournament was played at the Bren Events Center in Irvine, California during May 2008.

Penn State defeated Pepperdine in the final match, 3–1 (27–30, 33–31, 30–25, 30–23), to win their second national title. The Nittany Lions (30–1) were coached by Mark Pavlik.

Penn State's Matt Anderson was named the tournament's Most Outstanding Player. Anderson, along with six other players, comprised the All Tournament Team.

Qualification
Until the creation of the NCAA Men's Division III Volleyball Championship in 2012, there was only a single national championship for men's volleyball. As such, all NCAA men's volleyball programs, whether from Division I, Division II, or Division III, were eligible. A total of 4 teams were invited to contest this championship.

Tournament bracket 
Site: Bren Events Center, Irvine, California

All tournament team 
Matt Anderson, Penn State (Most outstanding player)
Max Holt, Penn State
Luke Murray, Penn State
Max Lipsitz, Penn State
Jonathan Winder, Pepperdine
Paul Carroll, Pepperdine
J.D. Schleppenbach, Pepperdine

See also 
 NCAA Men's National Collegiate Volleyball Championship
 NCAA Women's Volleyball Championships (Division I, Division II, Division III)

References

2008
NCAA Men's Volleyball Championship
NCAA Men's Volleyball Championship
2008 in sports in California
Volleyball in California